Bogue Homa is a stream in the U.S. state of Mississippi. It is a tributary to the Pearl River.

Bogue Homa is a name derived from the Choctaw language meaning "red creek". A variant name is "Bougahoma Bayou".

References

Rivers of Mississippi
Rivers of Hancock County, Mississippi
Tributaries of the Pearl River (Mississippi–Louisiana)
Mississippi placenames of Native American origin